Le Pontet (Provençal: Lo Pontet) is a commune in the Vaucluse department in the Provence-Alpes-Côte d'Azur region in southeastern France.

It is a suburb of the city of Avignon, and lies adjacent to the north side of the city. Its citizens are called Pontetienne/Pontetien.

Population

Sport
The city has many sports facilities: two gymnasiums, a municipal swimming pool, athletic field, a rugby league field, three main football pitches, basketball courts, a tennis club, etc.

Le Pontet is the home of Championnat de France Amateurs club, US Le Pontet.

Culture
Le Pontet is also a town of culture. For decades, the Château de Fargues and the Roberty's Domain have been the scene of several cultural events.
The Château de Fargues is also the city's school of music and dance.
Le Pontet also has an auditorium, a pétanque area and theaters.

Economy
Le Pontet has one of the largest business and retail parks in  Europe. Named  Avignon Nord, the area includes hundreds of shops, two shopping centers, a cinema, a bowling alley, and many companies.

See also
Communes of the Vaucluse department

References

External links
Official website 

Communes of Vaucluse